Stella Chen (born 1992) is an American violinist. She was the first prize winner of the 2019 Queen Elisabeth Competition in Brussels, Belgium. She was the fourth prize winner in the senior division of the 2008 Yehudi Menuhin International Competition for Young Violinists in Cardiff, Wales.

Biography 
Chen is a graduate of Harvard University (BA, psychology), the Juilliard School, and the New England Conservatory of Music, where she earned a master's degree. As of 2020, she studies at Juilliard under Li Lin and Catherine Cho at the Kronberg Academy.

Chen currently plays the 'Huggins' 1708 Stradivarius violin loaned from the Nippon Music Foundation.

Awards 

 2006: Fifth prize, junior division, Yehudi Menuhin International Competition for Young Violinists, Boulogne-sur-Mer, France
 2008: Fourth prize, senior division, Yehudi Menuhin International Competition for Young Violinists, Cardiff, Wales
 2015: Recipient, Robert Levin Prize, Harvard University
 2017: Second prize Winner, Tibor Varga International Violin Competition
 2019: First prize, Queen Elisabeth Competition, Brussels, Belgium
 2020: Recipient, Lincoln Center Emerging Artist Award
 2020: Recipient, Avery Fisher Career Grant

References

External links 

1992 births
Living people
American violinists
New England Conservatory alumni
21st-century classical violinists
Prize-winners of the Queen Elisabeth Competition
Harvard College alumni